Aphaenops is a genus of beetles in the family Carabidae, containing the following species:
All species in the genus are obligate troglobites, and each species is usually endemic to a single cave system; they are unpigmented, and have no functional eyes.
 Aphaenops abodiensis Dupre, 1988
 Aphaenops alberti Jeannel, 1939
 Aphaenops bessoni Cabidoche, 1962
 Aphaenops bonneti Foures, 1948
 Aphaenops bouilloni Coiffait, 1955
 Aphaenops bourdeaui Coiffait, 1976
 Aphaenops bucephalus Dieck, 1869
 Aphaenops carrerei Coiffait, 1953
 Aphaenops catalonicus Escola & Cancio, 1983
 Aphaenops cerberus Dieck, 1869
 Aphaenops chappuisi Coiffait, 1955
 Aphaenops cissauguensis Faille & Bourdeau, 2008
 Aphaenops coiffaitianus A. Gaudin, 1947
 Aphaenops crypticola Linder, 1859
 Aphaenops delbreili Genest, 1983
 Aphaenops eskualduna Coiffait, 1959
 Aphaenops fresnedai Faille & Bourdeau, 2011
 Aphaenops hidalgoi Espanol & Camas, 1985
 Aphaenops hustachei Jeannel, 1917
 Aphaenops jauzioni Faille, Deliot & Queinnec, 2007
 Aphaenops jeanneli Abeille da Perris, 1905
 Aphaenops laurenti Genest, 1983
 Aphaenops leschenaulti Bonvouloir, 1862
 Aphaenops linderi Jeannel, 1938
 Aphaenops loubensi Jeannel, 1953
 Aphaenops ludovici A. Gaudin, 1935
 Aphaenops mariaerosae Genest, 1983
 Aphaenops mensioni Mascaro, 1976
 Aphaenops michaeli Foures, 1954
 Aphaenops ochsi L. Gaudin, 1925
 Aphaenops orionis Fagniez, 1913
 Aphaenops parallelus Coiffait, 1955
 Aphaenops parvulus Faille, Bourdeau & Fresneda, 2010
 Aphaenops pluto Dieck, 1869
 Aphaenops queffelici Cabidoche, 1966
 Aphaenops rebereti A. Gaudin, 1947
 Aphaenops rhadamanthus Linden, 1860
 Aphaenops sioberae Foures, 1954
 Aphaenops tiresias Piochard de la Brulerie, 1872
 Aphaenops valleti Casale & Genest, 1986
 Aphaenops vandeli Foures, 1954

References